Jim Sharkey (12 February 1934 – 19 October 2014) was a Scottish professional footballer who played as a forward.

Career
Born in Glasgow, Sharkey played for Haverhill Rovers while on National Service. After playing for Rutherglen Glencairn, he signed for Celtic in 1954, making his senior debut for them in October 1955. He later played for Airdrie and Raith Rovers, making a total of 123 appearances in the Scottish Football League for all three clubs. He later played non-league football in England for Cambridge United, Wisbech Town, Corby Town, Bury Town, Newmarket Town, Sawston United and Girton.

Later life and death
After retiring as a player, Sharkey worked as a porter at Pembroke College, Cambridge. He died on 19 October 2014, at the age of 80.

References

1934 births
2014 deaths
Scottish footballers
Haverhill Rovers F.C. players
Rutherglen Glencairn F.C. players
Celtic F.C. players
Airdrieonians F.C. (1878) players
Raith Rovers F.C. players
Cambridge United F.C. players
Wisbech Town F.C. players
Corby Town F.C. players
Bury Town F.C. players
Newmarket Town F.C. players
Sawston United F.C. players
Scottish Football League players
Association football forwards